This is a list of Queensland University of Technology people, including notable past and present alumni and faculty of the Queensland University of Technology (QUT).

Alumni

Humanities

Arts

Ball Park Music, band
Conrad Coleby, actor
Gigi Edgley, actress
Roma Egan, dance teacher
Hayley Elsaesser, Canadian fashion designer
Gyton Grantley, actor
Tai Hara, actor, presenter
Darren Hayes, singer
Remy Hii, actor
Michelle Law, writer
Deborah Mailman, actress
Anna McGahan, actress
Kierin Meehan, choreographer, teacher, children's author
Kate Miller-Heidke, musician
Zoe Naylor, actress
Jason Nelson, artist in residence at QUT's The Cube Space, 2014–15; created the groundbreaking works NomenCluster and Cryptext
Josh Thomas, comedian 
Brenton Thwaites, actor
Amber Powson, actress, Miss Voluptuous Australia
Kalju Tonuma - record producer, audio artist
Senna Hegde, director
Yang Jin-Woo, South Korean actor

Education
Geoffrey Fitzgerald, Advanced Placement Physics C Teacher

Journalism and media

Tracey Curro, journalist and Communications Manager
Ben Davis, drive presenter on 4BC in Brisbane
Nick Etchells, senior reporter for Seven News in Melbourne
Natasha Exelby, 10 News First presenter
Ben Fajzullin, journalist
Sharyn Ghidella, journalist and Channel Seven presenter
Peter Greste, correspondent for Al Jazeera
Spencer Howson, ABC radio presenter
Emmy Kubainski, former co-presenter of Nine News Perth
Leila McKinnon, journalist for Nine Network
Paul Osborne, Canberra bureau chief for AAP newswire
Alanah Pearce, video game writer and former journalist
Leigh Sales, host of the ABC's 7.30 Report
Karl Stefanovic, journalist and presenter

Literature, writing and poetry
Diane Cilento, Author, actress, dramatist and playwright. Founder of the Creative Industries Artist in Residence Program.

Philosophy and theology
Philip Freier, Anglican Archbishop of Melbourne
Ken Ham, founder of Answers in Genesis, Creation Museum and Creation Ministries International

Government

Politicians

Peter Beattie, former Premier of Queensland
Jarrod Bleijie MP, Former Attorney-General of Queensland and Minister for Justice
Sue Boyce, Liberal member of the Australian Senate
Alvin Cheng Kam-moon, Hong Kong student activist and founder of Student Front
Steven Ciobo MP, Federal Member for Moncrieff
Yvette D'Ath MP, Federal Member for Petrie and Attorney-General of Queensland
Peter Dutton MP, Federal Member for Dickson; Minister for Immigration and Border Protection
Teresa Gambaro MP, Federal Member for Brisbane
Linda Lavarch, former Queensland Attorney-General
Michael Lavarch, former Australian Attorney-General
Joe Ludwig, ALP member of the Australian Senate
Graham Perrett MP, Federal Member for Moreton
Keith Pitt MP, Federal Member for Hinkler
Bernie Ripoll MP, member of the Australian House of Representatives, representing the Division of Oxley
Stuart Robert MP, Federal Member for Fadden
Wayne Swan MP, Federal Member for Lilley and former Treasurer of Australia
Chris Trevor MP, Federal Member for Flynn
Amy Lubik City Councillor for Port Moody
Kate Jones MP

Law
Tim Carmody, former Chief Justice of the Supreme Court of Queensland
Kerry Carrington, QUT research professor and former head of the School of Justice
Leanne Clare SC, Judge of Brisbane District Court of Queensland
Michael Lavarch, Professor Emeritus and former Executive Dean of the Faculty of Law
Brian Fitzgerald (academic), specialist research professor of law
John Pyke, physicist and former QUT law lecturer
Bryan Horrigan, former QUT associate professor

Medicine and sciences
 Steve Lawrence, computer scientist

Other
Major General Michael Fairweather, AM, Army Reserve Officer, teacher, marketing leadership - agriculture, food,  technology and Defence
Georgia Sheehan, diver

Notable faculty
 Axel Bruns, Professor of Communication and Media Studies
 Jean Burgess, Professor of Digital Media
 Ray Chan, Adjunct Professor, School of Nursing
 Peter Corke, Distinguished Professor of Robotics
 Greg Creed, CEO of Yum! Brands
 Stuart Cunningham, Distinguished Emeritus Professor of Communication and Media Studies
 Brian Fitzgerald
 Michael Gabbett, Associate Professor of Biomedical Sciences and Clinical Geneticist
 Dennis Gibson
 Colleen Nelson, Chair of Prostate Cancer Research
 Dale Nyholt,  Professor in the School of Biomedical Science
 Chris Sarra,
 Arun Sharma, distinguished emeritus professor
 Mahinda Vilathgamuwa, Professor of Power Systems
 Chelsea Watego, Professor of Indigenous Health
 Patsy Yates,  Distinguished Professor and Executive Dean of the Faculty of Health

See also
 :Category:Queensland University of Technology alumni
 :Category:Queensland University of Technology faculty
 Queensland University of Technology Student Guild

References

5. ^ https://mobile.twitter.com/kendallgilding7/status/471822467896315904

 
Queensland University of Technology
Queensland University of Technology